Hannah Victoria Diaz (born February 17, 1996) is an American professional soccer player who plays as a forward for Orca Kamogawa FC of the Nadeshiko League.

College career 
Diaz played for Saint Mary's Gaels women's soccer team from 2014 to 2017.

Club career 
Diaz signed for Houston Dash in July 2021. She was waived in April 2022.

References

External links 
 
 Saint Mary's Gaels bio

1996 births
Living people
American women's soccer players
Women's association football midfielders
Saint Mary's Gaels women's soccer players
Orca Kamogawa FC players
Lille OSC (women) players
FC Fleury 91 (women) players
Houston Dash players
Division 1 Féminine players
National Women's Soccer League players
Soccer players from California
American expatriate women's soccer players
American expatriate sportspeople in France
Expatriate women's footballers in France